John Sherry (c. 1506 – 1555), was the Anglican Archdeacon of Lewes in East Sussex, England, between 1542 and 1551.

Life
Sherry was born around 1506 in London. He later took up a literary and academic career. In 1522, he became a demy, or a foundation scholar of Magdalen College, Oxford, and graduated as a B.A. on 21 June 1527. He went on to receive an M.A. on 10 March 1531. In 1534, he was appointed headmaster of Magdalen College School, Oxford, and held this post until 1540, when he was succeeded by Goodall. Subsequently, he established himself in London and devoted himself to literary work, completing both some original writings and translations of the works of others.

Works
 ‘A very fruitfull Exposition upon the Syxte Chapter of Saynte John. Written in Latin by John Brencius (Johannes Brenz) and translated by Richard Shirrye,’ London, 1550, 8vo.
 ‘A Treatise of Schemes and Tropes gathered out of the best Grammarians and Oratours. Whereunto is added a declamation written fyrst in Latin by Erasmus,’ London, n.d. 16mo; 1550, 8vo.
 ‘St Basil the Great his letter to Gregory Nazianzen translated by Richard Sherrie,’ London, n.d. 8vo.
 ‘A Treatise of the Figures of Grammer [sic] and Rhetorike,’ London, 1555, 8vo.

Notes

References

Sources

Further reading
Hildebrandt, H. W. (before 1965). A Critical Edition of Richard Sherry's "A Treatise of Schemes and Tropes". (Ph.D. thesis)
--do.-- (1961). A Treatise of Schemes and Tropes, 1550, by Richard Sherry; and his translation of the Education of Children by Desiderius Erasmus; with an introduction by Herbert W. Hildebrandt. Gainesville: Scholars' Facsimiles and Reprints

Archdeacons of Lewes
1551 deaths
1506 births
16th-century English writers
16th-century male writers
Writers from London
Alumni of Magdalen College, Oxford
16th-century English translators
16th-century English educators
English male non-fiction writers
Masters of Magdalen College School, Oxford